Kedavoor  is a village in Kozhikode district in the Indian state of Kerala.

Demographics
 India census, Kedavoor had a population of 15121 with 7457 males and 7664 females.

References

Villages in Kozhikode district